Zgornji Okrog is a former settlement in the Municipality of Kamnik in central Slovenia. It is now part of the village of Okrog pri Motniku. The area is part of the traditional region of Upper Carniola. The municipality is now included in the Central Slovenia Statistical Region.

Geography

Name
Together with the related name Krog, the name Okrog is relatively common in Slovenia. It is derived from the common noun krog 'rounded hill', referring to the local topography. Before the Second World War, Spodnji Okrog was known as Kozji Hrbet and Zgornji Okrog was simply called Okrog.

History
In 1952, the three former villages of Peteržilje, Spodnji Okrog, and Zgornji Okrog were combined into a single village named Spodnji Okrog. In 1955, the name of the newly combined settlement was changed from Spodnji Okrog to Okrog pri Motniku.

Cultural heritage
There are two wayside shrines in Zgornji Okrog that are registered as cultural heritage. The first one stands in the western part of the settlement and dates from the twentieth century. It marks the place where mourners would rest with the deceased on the way to the church in Špitalič. A second shrine stands east of the village along a field road.

References

External links

Zgornji Okrog on Geopedia

Populated places in the Municipality of Kamnik
Former settlements in Slovenia